Pampu Facula is a bright region on the surface of Mercury, located at 57.76° S, 31.79° W.  It was named by the IAU in 2019.  Pampu is the Tamil word for snake.

Pampu Facula is centered northeast of Hesiod crater.

References

Surface features of Mercury